In the European continental judicial tradition, the national councils of the judiciary are institutions that ensure the self-management of the judiciary and the effective delivery of justice, which are autonomous or independent of the executive and legislature.

At the European Union level, they are gathered in the European Network of Councils for the Judiciary (ENCJ).

National judicial councils in EU member states 

 : Conseil Supérieur de la Justice / Hoge Raad voor de Justitie
 : Висш Съдебен Съвет / Supreme Judicial Council
 : Državno sudbeno vijeće
 : Domstolsstyrelsen
 :  / Domstolsverket / National Courts Administration
 : 
 : Ανώτατο Δικαστικό Συμβούλιο / Supreme Judicial Council of Civil and Criminal Justice
 : Ανώτατο Δικαστικό Συμβούλιο Διοικητικής Δικαιοσύνης / Supreme Judicial Council for Administrative Justice
 :  / National Judicial Council
 : Courts Service
 : Consiglio Superiore della Magistratura
 : Consiglio di Presidenza della giustizia amministrativa
 : Tieslietu padome
 : 
 : Commission for the Administration of Justice of Malta
 : 
 : Krajowa Rada Sądownictwa
 : 
 : 
 : 
 : 
 : Consejo General del Poder Judicial

Other national councils of the judiciary 

 : High Council of Prosecutors and High Judicial Council
 : Conselho Nacional de Justiça
 : Visoko sudsko i tužilačko vijeće BiH
 : Canadian Judicial Council
 : Superior Council of Judicature
 : Kosovo Judicial Council
 : High Council of Judges and Prosecutors
 : Judicial and Prosecutorial Councils of Montenegro
 : High Judicial Council, State Prosecutorial Council
 : Council of Judges and Prosecutors
 : Supreme Council of Justice
 
  / : Judges' Council of England and Wales
 : Judges' Council
 : Judicial Council
 : Judicial Conference of the United States, with support from the Administrative Office of the United States Courts and judicial councils in each federal judicial circuit
 : Judicial Council of California

See also 
 Judicial Council
 Judiciary committee
 National Judicial Council

Note